WKXO is an AM radio station licensed to the city of Berea, Kentucky.  It broadcasts on a frequency of 1500 kHz and is a daytime-only station.  The format is known as News/Talk 103.5.

WKXO was a Top 40 station in the early 70's.

1500 AM is a United States clear-channel frequency; two stations share Class A status:
WFED in Washington, D.C. 
KSTP in Minneapolis, Minnesota.

FM translator
WKXO relays its programming to an FM translator in order to widen the coverage area and also to provide 24 hour coverage.  The translator frequency is used in the station branding.

References

External links
103.5 WKXO Facebook

KXO
Radio stations established in 1971
1971 establishments in Kentucky
KXO